The 1985 NCAA Division I-A football season saw the Oklahoma Sooners, led by head coach Barry Switzer, win the national championship.

Oklahoma finished the season 11–1, with their only loss to Miami at home, in a game in which future NFL star Troy Aikman was lost for the season.  The Sooners regrouped and went undefeated the rest of the way, finishing the season with a win over Penn State in the Orange Bowl.

Michigan would finish No. 2, the highest finish of a Bo Schembechler led team.  The team shined on defense, led by All-Americans Mike Hammerstein and Mark Messner.

Tennessee finished the season with a victory over No. 2 Miami in the Sugar Bowl.  This team won the school's first SEC championship in 16 years and was nicknamed the "Sugar Vols".  The SEC title was the first of three for coach Johnny Majors.

Air Force Falcons, under Fisher DeBerry had what is considered their best season ever, defeating Texas in the Bluebonnet Bowl and finishing No. 8 in the AP Poll (No. 5 in the Coaches' Poll).

This year's edition of the Iron Bowl is widely considered to be one of the greatest ever. Despite Auburn having Heisman Trophy winner Bo Jackson on its side, Alabama won this game with a last second field goal.

This would be the last year for the I-A/I-AA hybrid Missouri Valley Conference in football. Five of the seven teams in the conference (Drake, Illinois State, Indiana State, Southern Illinois, and West Texas State) had been playing Division I-AA football since the 1982 season, while Tulsa and Wichita State would remain I-A, becoming independents the following season.

Rule changes
 Kickoffs that sail through the end zone untouched will be placed at the 20-yard line, rescinding a rule adopted in 1984 that required the ball be placed at the 30-yard line.
 Offensive lineman will be allowed to use extended arms and open hands on all blocks, not just retreat blocks.
 The use of two goalposts is prohibited. All goalposts must now be of the "tuning fork" or "slingshot" style, with the crossbar rising from a single post. 
 The seven-man officiating crew is now mandatory for all Division I-A conferences.

September
The preseason AP Poll was led by No. 1 Oklahoma, No. 2 Auburn, No. 3 SMU, No. 4 Iowa, and No. 5 Florida. None of the top teams played in the first week of the season, so the top five remained the same in the first-regular season poll.

September 7: No. 1 Oklahoma and No. 4 Iowa had not started their seasons. No. 2 Auburn opened with a 49-7 defeat of Southwestern Louisiana. No. 3 SMU’s 35-23 victory over UTEP did not impress the AP voters enough to keep the Mustangs in the top five. They fell behind No. 5 Florida, who won 35-23 at Miami, and No. 6 USC, who defeated No. 11 Illinois 20-10. The next poll featured No. 1 Auburn, No. 2 Oklahoma, No. 3 Florida, No. 4 USC, and No. 5 Iowa.

September 14: No. 1 Auburn won 29-18 over Southern Mississippi. No. 2 Oklahoma and No. 6 SMU were scheduled to play each other this weekend, but the game was postponed until December at the request of the television broadcasters. No. 3 Florida played Rutgers to a 28-28 tie. No. 5 Iowa opened with a 58-0 shutout of Drake, and No. 4 USC was idle. The next poll featured No. 1 Auburn, No. 2 Oklahoma, No. 3 USC, No. 4 Iowa, and No. 5 SMU.

September 21: No. 1 Auburn was idle, and No. 2 Oklahoma still had not begun their season. No. 3 USC lost 20-13 to Baylor. No. 4 Iowa beat Northern Illinois 48-20. No. 5 SMU was idle and fell out of the top five again. Moving up were No. 6 Florida State, who defeated Memphis 19-10 and had beaten perennial power Nebraska a few weeks earlier, and No. 7 Ohio State, who won 36-13 at Colorado. The top five in the next poll were No. 1 Auburn, No. 2 Oklahoma, No. 3 Iowa, No. 4 Florida State, and No. 5 Ohio State.

September 28: No. 1 Auburn lost 38-20 at Tennessee. No. 2 Oklahoma finally began their schedule with a 13-7 win at Minnesota, but the voters were more impressed by No. 3 Iowa’s 57-3 blowout of Iowa State. No. 4 Florida State got past Kansas 24-20, No. 5 Ohio State beat Washington State 48-32, and No. 6 SMU won 56-21 at TCU. The top five in the next poll were No. 1 Iowa, No. 2 Oklahoma, No. 3 SMU, No. 4 Florida State, and No. 5 Ohio State.

October
October 5: No. 1 Iowa got past Michigan State 35-31 on a bootleg run by quarterback Chuck Long for a touchdown with 27 seconds left. No. 2 Oklahoma won 41-6 at Kansas State. No. 3 SMU fell 28-6 to Arizona and soon dropped out of the polls, finishing just 6-5. No. 4 Florida State was idle. No. 5 Ohio State lost a close one, 31-28 at Illinois. No. 6 Oklahoma State (25-13 over Tulsa) and No. 7 Michigan (33-6 over Wisconsin) moved up in the next poll: No. 1 Iowa, No. 2 Oklahoma, No. 3 Michigan, No. 4 Florida State, and No. 5 Oklahoma State.

October 12: No. 1 Iowa won 23-13 at Wisconsin. No. 2 Oklahoma beat No. 17 Texas 14-7, but once again a lower-ranked team was more dominant than the Sooners as No. 3 Michigan overwhelmed Michigan State 31-0. No. 4 Florida State lost 59-27 at No. 12 Auburn, and No. 5 Oklahoma State fell 34-24 to No. 9 Nebraska. Moving up were No. 6 Arkansas, who won 30-7 at Texas Tech, and No. 7 Florida, who handled No. 14 Tennessee 17-10. The top five in the next poll were No. 1 Iowa, No. 2 Michigan, No. 3 Oklahoma, No. 4 Arkansas, and No. 5 Florida.

October 19: In a memorable Big Ten showdown between No. 1 Iowa and No. 2 Michigan, the Hawkeyes prevailed 12-10 on a field goal with two seconds left. No. 3 Oklahoma, playing their first home game of the year, lost 27-14 to Miami. No. 4 Arkansas also lost, falling 15-13 to Texas; both Iowa and the Longhorns scored all of their points on field goals in this weekend’s victories. No. 5 Florida moved up again with a 45-0 shutout of Southwestern Louisiana. No. 6 Penn State won 24-20 at Syracuse, and No. 7 Nebraska defeated Missouri 28-20. The top five in the next poll were No. 1 Iowa, No. 2 Florida, No. 3 Penn State, No. 4 Michigan, and No. 5 Nebraska.

October 26: This weekend finally saw some stability at the top. No. 1 Iowa visited Northwestern and won 49-10, No. 2 Florida beat Virginia Tech 35-18, No. 3 Penn State blanked West Virginia 27-0, No. 4 Michigan defeated Indiana 42-15, and No. 5 Nebraska won 17-7 over Colorado. The top five remained the same in the next poll.

November
November 2: No. 1 Iowa fell 22-13 to No. 8 Ohio State, while No. 2 Florida handled No. 6 Auburn 14-10. No. 3 Penn State defeated Boston College 16-12, but No. 4 Michigan had to settle for a 3-3 tie against Illinois. No. 5 Nebraska won 41-3 at Kansas State. No. 7 Air Force moved up with a 31-10 victory over San Diego State, becoming the first service academy in two decades to be ranked in the top five: No. 1 Florida, No. 2 Penn State, No. 3 Nebraska, No. 4 Ohio State, and No. 5 Air Force. Because Florida was on probation for recruiting violations and ineligible to be ranked in the Coaches’ Poll, the coaches picked Penn State as their top team.

November 9: No. 1 Florida went down 24-3 to No. 17 Georgia, and No. 2 Penn State grabbed the top spot in both polls with a 31-10 win at Cincinnati. No. 3 Nebraska overwhelmed Iowa State 49-0, No. 4 Ohio State won 35-17 at Northwestern, No. 5 Air Force beat Army 45-7, and No. 6 Iowa shut out Illinois 59-0. The next poll featured No. 1 Penn State, No. 2 Nebraska, No. 3 Ohio State, No. 4 Air Force, and No. 5 Iowa.

November 16: The top two teams won easily, as No. 1 Penn State defeated Notre Dame 36-6 and No. 2 Nebraska beat Kansas 56-6. Less fortunate were No. 3 Ohio State, who fell 12-7 to Wisconsin, and No. 4 Air Force, who lost 28-21 at No. 16 Brigham Young. No. 5 Iowa edged Purdue 27-24, while No. 6 Miami was idle. No. 7 Oklahoma shut out Colorado 31-0 and moved back into the top five: No. 1 Penn State, No. 2 Nebraska, No. 3 Iowa, No. 4 Miami, and No. 5 Oklahoma.

November 23: No. 1 Penn State, the only remaining undefeated team, finished their season with a 31-0 blowout of Pittsburgh. As was often the case in this era, the Big 8 championship came down to a battle between No. 2 Nebraska and No. 5 Oklahoma. This year the Sooners had an easy time, clinching an Orange Bowl berth with a 27-7 defeat of the Cornhuskers. No. 3 Iowa earned the Big Ten title and a Rose Bowl berth with a 31-9 win over Minnesota. Their opponent in Pasadena would be No. 8 UCLA, who lost 17-13 to USC this weekend but had already clinched the Pac-10 title. No. 4 Miami breezed past Colorado State 24-3. Iowa’s victory eliminated No. 6 Michigan from Big Ten contention, but the Wolverines still came away with a 27-17 win over their rival, No. 12 Ohio State. The next poll featured No. 1 Penn State, No. 2 Iowa, No. 3 Oklahoma, No. 4 Miami, and No. 5 Michigan.

November 28-30: No. 1 Penn State, No. 2 Iowa, and No. 5 Michigan had finished their schedules. No. 3 Oklahoma, already assured of the Big 8 title, shut out No. 17 Oklahoma State 13-0, while No. 4 Miami dominated Notre Dame 58-7. In addition, the final two bowl tie-ins were determined this weekend. No. 10 Tennessee shut out Vanderbilt 30-0 to tie Florida for the SEC title; even though the Gators had the head-to-head advantage, their probation barred them from postseason games and delivered the Sugar Bowl spot to the Volunteers. Meanwhile, No. 15 Texas A&M and No. 18 Texas played each other for the SWC championship, and the Aggies dominated the Longhorns 42-10 to earn a Cotton Bowl berth. Miami moved up in the next poll: No. 1 Penn State, No. 2 Miami, No. 3 Iowa, No. 4 Oklahoma, and No. 5 Michigan.

December
December 7: No. 4 Oklahoma finally played the game against SMU which had originally been scheduled for September 14, and the Sooners’ 35-13 victory moved them up one spot in the final poll of the regular season: No. 1 Penn State, No. 2 Miami, No. 3 Oklahoma, No. 4 Iowa, and No. 5 Michigan.

The highest-ranked postseason matchup would be the Orange Bowl between undefeated No. 1 Penn State and No. 3 Oklahoma. No. 2 Miami, the only team to defeat Oklahoma in the regular season, matched up with No. 8 Tennessee in the Sugar Bowl. The Rose Bowl featured the traditional Big Ten vs. Pac-10 game with No. 4 Iowa against No. 13 UCLA, and the Cotton Bowl pitted No. 11 Texas A&M against No. 16 Auburn. No. 5 Michigan and No. 7 Nebraska, the top-ranked teams which finished second in their respective conferences, would square off in the Fiesta Bowl.

Conference standings

AP Final Poll

Oklahoma
Michigan
Penn State
Tennessee
Florida
Texas A&M
UCLA
Air Force
Miami (FL)
Iowa
Nebraska
Arkansas
Alabama
Ohio State
Florida State
BYU
Baylor
Maryland
Georgia Tech
LSU

Final Coaches Poll
 Oklahoma
 Michigan
 Penn St.
 Tennessee
 Air Force
 UCLA
 Texas A&M
 Miami (FL)
 Iowa
 Nebraska
 Ohio St.
 Arkansas
 Florida St.
 Alabama
 Baylor
 Fresno St.
 Brigham Young
 Georgia Tech
 Maryland
 LSU

Notable rivalry games
Alabama 25, Auburn 23
Arizona 16, Arizona State 13
Florida 38, Florida State 14
Georgia 24, Florida 3
Georgia Tech 20, Georgia 16
Iowa 57, Iowa State 3
LSU 31, Tulane 19
Michigan 31, Michigan State 0
Michigan 27, Ohio State 17
Minnesota 27, Wisconsin 18
Navy 17, Army 7
Notre Dame 37, USC 3
Oklahoma 27, Nebraska 7
Oklahoma 13, Oklahoma State 0
Oklahoma 14, Texas 7
Oregon 34, Oregon State 13
Stanford 24, California 22
Texas A&M 42, Texas 10
USC 17, UCLA 13
Washington State 21, Washington 20

AP Poll No. 1 and No. 2 progress

Bowl games

Rose Bowl: No. 13 UCLA 45, No. 4 Iowa 28
Sugar Bowl: No. 8 Tennessee 35, No. 2 Miami (FL) 7
Cotton Bowl: No. 11 Texas A&M 36, No. 16 Auburn 16
Orange Bowl: No. 3 Oklahoma 25, No. 1 Penn State 10

Other Bowls:
Fiesta Bowl: No. 5 Michigan 27, No. 7 Nebraska 23
Florida Citrus Bowl: No. 17 Ohio State 10, No. 9 Brigham Young 7
Gator Bowl: No. 18 Florida State 34, No. 19 Oklahoma State 23
Holiday Bowl: No. 14 Arkansas 18,  Arizona State 17
Peach Bowl: Army 31, Illinois 29
Sun Bowl: No. 20 Arizona 13, Georgia 13
Independence Bowl: Minnesota 20, Clemson 13
Liberty Bowl: Baylor 21, No. 12 LSU 7
Aloha Bowl: No. 15 Alabama 24, USC 3 
Bluebonnet Bowl: No. 10 Air Force 24, Texas 16
California Bowl: Fresno State 51, No. 20 Bowling Green 7
Hall of Fame Classic: Georgia Tech 17, Michigan State 14
Freedom Bowl: Washington 20, Colorado 17
Cherry Bowl: Maryland 35, Syracuse 18

Heisman Trophy voting
The Heisman Trophy is given to the year's most outstanding player

Source:

Other annual awards
Maxwell Award (College Player of the Year) - Chuck Long, Iowa
Walter Camp Award (Back) - Bo Jackson, Auburn
Davey O'Brien Award (Quarterback) - Chuck Long, Iowa
Dick Butkus Award (Linebacker) - Brian Bosworth, Oklahoma
Lombardi Award (Lineman or Linebacker) - Tony Casillas, Oklahoma
Outland Trophy (Interior Lineman) - Mike Ruth, Boston College, 0T
Paul "Bear" Bryant Award - Fisher DeBerry, Air Force

References